Barhi subdivision is an administrative subdivision of the Hazaribagh district in the North Chotanagpur division in the state of Jharkhand, India.

History
Barhi was once a subdivisional town (up to 1872).

Administrative set up
Hazaribagh district is divided in to two subdivisions – Hazaribagh Sadar and Barhi. There are 16 CD blocks and 15 revenue anchals with 1 statutory town, 16 census towns, 1308 villages and 257 gram panchayats in the district.

Details of the subdivision are as follows:

Note: Data calculated on the basis of census data for CD blocks and may vary a little against unpublished official data.

Demographics
According to the 2011 Census of India data, Barhi subdivision, in Hazaribagh district, had a total population of 523,834. There were 267,645 (51%) males and 257,189 (49%) females. Scheduled castes numbered 97,542 (18.62%) and scheduled tribes numbered 16,692 (3.19%). The literacy rate was 67.00% (for the population below 6 years).

Police stations
Police stations in Hazaribagh Sadar subdivision are at:

Barhi
Barkatha
Chauparan
Gorhar

Blocks
Community development blocks in the Barhi subdivision are:

Education
In 2011, in the Barhi subdivision out of a total 490 inhabited villages there were 97 villages with pre-primary schools, 366 villages with primary schools, 185 villages with middle schools, 50 villages with secondary schools, 17 villages with senior secondary schools, 1 village with non-formal education centre, 4 villages with vocational training centres/ ITI, 115 villages with no educational facility
.*Senior secondary schools are also known as Inter colleges in Jharkhand

Educational institutions

The following institution is located in Barhi subdivision:

Ram Narayan Yadav Memorial College was established at Barhi in 1985.

Healthcare
In 2011, in the Barhi subdivision there were 14 villages with primary health centres, 46 villages with primary health subcentres, 8 villages with maternity and child welfare centres, 7 villages with allopathic hospitals, 13 villages with dispensaries, 1 village with veterinary hospital, 2 villages with family welfare centres, and 37 villages with medicine shops.
*Private medical practitioners, alternative medicine etc. not included

Medical facilities
(Anybody having referenced information about location of government/ private medical facilities may please add it here)

References

Sub-divisions in Jharkhand